Thomas George De Largie d'Alton (8 December 1895 – 7 May 1968) was an Australian politician and diplomat. He was born in Warracknabeal in Victoria. In 1931 d'Alton was elected to the Tasmanian House of Assembly as a Labor member for Darwin. d'Alton was a minister from 1934 to 1943, including the Minister for Agriculture from December 1939 to November 1943; and he served as the Deputy Premier between 1941 and 1943.

In 1943 Herbert Evatt saw a need for a High Commissioner in Wellington to coordinate views (a new post) and chose the "colourful figure" d'Alton, who however chose to retain his seat and salary in the Tasmanian Parliament. Three months after arriving he got into a punch-up with the landlord of the Post Office Hotel, Wellington. Questions from the Opposition in the Federal Parliament asked if he was a worthy reply to boxer Bob Fitzsimmons the Freckled Wonder who moved to Australia from New Zealand.

In 1946 he was the subject of a Royal Commission alleging corruption. He was elected to the Tasmanian Legislative Council, again representing Labor, for the seat of Gordon in 1947, serving until his death in Hobart in 1968.

References

1895 births
1968 deaths
Members of the Tasmanian House of Assembly
Australian Labor Party members of the Parliament of Tasmania
High Commissioners of Australia to New Zealand
20th-century Australian politicians
People from Warracknabeal